Askew is an English surname. Notable people with the surname include:

Sports people
B. J. Askew (born 1980), American football player
Billy Askew (born 1959), English footballer
Carl Askew (born 1952), Australian motorcycle speedway and drag bike rider
Dave Askew (born 1963), English darts player
Dean Askew (born 1962), New Zealand cricketer
John Askew (1908–1942), English rugby and cricket player
Lynsey Askew (born 1986), English cricketer
Matthias Askew (born 1982), American football player
Oliver Askew (born 1996), American race car driver
Philip Askew (born 1973), British ice dancer
Rayshawn Askew (born 1979), American football player
Sonny Askew (born 1957), American soccer player
Tosh Askew, English rugby coach
Vincent Askew (born 1966), American basketball player

Other people
Anne Askew (1520/1521–1546), English poet and Protestant persecuted as a heretic
Anthony Askew (fl. 1699–1774), English physician and book collector
Barry Askew (1936–2012), English newspaper editor
Christopher Crackenthorp Askew (born 23 May 1782), Royal Navy Captain 
Desmond Askew (born 1972), English actor
Edward Ayscu or Askew (1550–1616/17), English historian
Egeon Askew (1576–unknown), English divine
Felicity Askew (born 1899), English sculptor
George Askew (born 1986), UK reality TV participant
George Edward Askew (died 1779), English dramatist and travel writer
Sir Henry Askew (1775–1847), lieutenant-general in the British army
Janet Askew (died 2015), New Zealand nurse
John Bertram Askew (1869–1929), socialist translator
Lucy Jane Askew (1883–1997), briefly the oldest person in Europe
Luke Askew (1932–2012), American actor
Reginald Askew (1928–2012), British Anglican priest and academic
Reubin Askew (1928–2014), American politician, governor of Florida
Rilla Askew (born 1951), American novelist and short story writer 
Steve Askew (born 1957), English guitarist, formerly with Kajagoogoo
Terry Askew, creator of British children's sci-fi audio series The Space Gypsy Adventures
Valerie Askew (1939–2020), British modelling agent
Walter "Salty Walt" Askew, American sea shanty singer
William Askew (1490–1541), juror in the trial of Anne Boleyn, father of Anne Askew
Claire Askew (born 1986), British author

See also
Askew, Mississippi, an unincorporated community
Askew Codex, ancient parchment of gnostic writings
Askew Institute on Politics and Society in Florida
Askew School of Public Administration and Policy in Florida
View Askew Productions - American film production studio